Reichler is a German language surname. It stems from the male given name Richard – and may refer to:
Claudia Reichler (1963), German former footballer
Joe Reichler (1915–1988), American sports writer

References 

German-language surnames
Surnames from given names